Rudolf Wild & Co. is a food company headquartered in Eppelheim, near Heidelberg, Germany.

The company produces natural ingredients for food products. WILD has around 2,500 employees in over 70 countries, 1,400 of whom are employed at the main plant in Eppelheim.
The company is based on three core businesses: the production of ingredients for the food and beverage industry, the construction of processing equipment and machinery (WILD INDAG) and the production and sale of its own brand products and end products. One of the latter, Capri Sun, is sold in over 100 countries.

History
The company was founded as Zick-Zack Werk Rudolf Wild by Rudolf Wild in Heidelberg in 1931. The company was relocated to the neighboring town of Eppelheim 6 years later. In 1956, Wild acquired the Hamburg-based SiSi-Werke, which had been one of the most important producers of essences in Germany before the war and began producing and selling Capri-Sun in 1969. In the 1970s, Wild expanded his business into other countries, primarily Switzerland and the United States. WILD has since developed into a global group under the management of Hans-Peter Wild.

References

Literature
Hans-Peter Wild: Capri-Sonne. Die Faszination einer Weltmarke. (Capri-Sun. The fascination of a global brand), Frankfurter Allgemeine Buch, Frankfurt am Main 2001,

External links

 Wild webpage
 Capri-Sun webpage

Food and drink companies of Germany